Veerle Dejaeghere (born 1 August 1973, in Izegem) is a Belgian runner, who has specialized in the 3000 metres steeplechase. She represented her country at the Summer Olympics in 2000 and 2008.

Dejaeghere formerly specialized in the 1500 metres, reaching the semi-final in this event at the 2000 Summer Olympics.

She has been very successful in the Lotto Cross Cup (Belgium's domestic cross country series), having won the series overall a total of 13 times, including 11 consecutive wins from 2004 to 14. This included a win at the Lotto Cross Cup Brussels in 2007, in which she finished ahead of Lornah Kiplagat and Emebt Etea. She has also won twice at the Eurocross meeting in Luxembourg.

Dejaeghere missed most of the 2009 and 2010 seasons. She was the runner-up at the Campaccio race in January 2011, but did not compete again until November's Lotto Cross Cup van West-Vlaanderen, where she was again runner-up (this time behind Yuliya Ruban).

Achievements

Personal bests 
 1500 metres⁣ – 4:05.05 min (2002)
 Mile run⁣ – 4:29.93 min (2003)
 3000 metres⁣ – 8:49.31 min (2000)
 3000 metres steeplechase⁣ – 9:28.47 min (2007)
 5000 metres⁣ – 15:19.73 min (2005)

References

External links 
 
 

1973 births
Living people
Belgian female long-distance runners
Belgian female steeplechase runners
Athletes (track and field) at the 2000 Summer Olympics
Athletes (track and field) at the 2008 Summer Olympics
Athletes (track and field) at the 2016 Summer Olympics
Olympic athletes of Belgium
People from Izegem
Sportspeople from West Flanders